Juan de Arteaga y Avendaño (died 1540) was a Roman Catholic prelate who was appointed the second Bishop of Chiapas (1540).

Biography
Juan de Arteaga y Avendaño was born in Estepa, Spain.  On 16 Jul 1540, he was appointed during the papacy of Pope Paul III as Bishop of Chiapas. He died before he was consecrated bishop on 8 Sep 1540.

References

External links and additional sources
 (for Chronology of Bishops) 
 (for Chronology of Bishops)  

16th-century Roman Catholic bishops in Mexico
Bishops appointed by Pope Paul III
1540 deaths